The 2009–10 season was the 127th season of competitive soccer in Australia.

National teams

Men's senior

Friendly matches

2011 AFC Asian Cup Qualification

2010 FIFA World Cup

Group D

Men's under-20

Friendlies

AFF U-19 Youth Championship

FIFA U-20 World Cup

AFC U-19 Championship qualification

Men's under-17

AFC U-16 Championship qualification

Women's senior

Friendlies

AFC Women's Asian Cup

Women's under-20

Friendlies

AFC U-19 Women's Championship

Australia U-17

AFF U-16 Women's Championship

AFC U-16 Women's Championship

A-League

Table

Final series

2010 A-League Grand Final

State and Territorial Leagues

NSW Premier League

NBN State Football League

Table

Final series

Queensland State League

Victorian Premier League

Tasmanian Southern Premier League

Tasmania Northern Premier League

South Australian Super League

Football West Premier League

ACT Premier League

Northern Zone Premier League

Honors

Australian clubs in Asia

Summary

Melbourne Victory

Adelaide United

References

External links
 Football Federation Australia
 Capital Football
 Football NSW
 Northern NSW Football
 Football Federation Victoria
 Football Queensland
 Football West
 Football Federation of South Australia
 Football Federation Tasmania
 Football Federation Northern Territory

 
Seasons in Australian soccer